The Ulster Volkswagen Classic was a women's professional golf tournament on the Ladies European Tour held in Northern Ireland. It was played annually between 1984 and 1987 at Belvoir Park Golf Club in Belfast.

Winners

Source:

References

External links
Ladies European Tour

Former Ladies European Tour events
Golf tournaments in Northern Ireland
Defunct sports competitions in Northern Ireland
Recurring sporting events established in 1984
Recurring sporting events disestablished in 1987